Sabotage Squad is a 1942 American action film directed by Lew Landers and written by Bernice Petkere, Wallace Sullivan and David Silverstein. The film stars Bruce Bennett, Kay Harris, Edward Norris, Sidney Blackmer, Don Beddoe and John Tyrrell. The film was released on August 27, 1942, by Columbia Pictures.

Plot
Small-time gambler Eddie is rejected for military service due to ill health. His girlfriend, Edith, has turned to cop John Cronin to help get Eddie out of trouble. Cronin thinks the hair salon where Edith works is a front for a Nazy spy ring because Dr. Harrison, head of a research institute, keeps visiting it. Eddie's friend Chuck, a pickpocket, steals Harrison's wallet and finds a secret Nazi medallion inside. Frightened, Chuck gives the wallet to Eddie. Cronin tails Eddie, hoping that he'll lead the police to the wallet's owner. After a series of coincidences, Harrison kidnaps Eddie, Chuck, and Edith. Chuck manages to free the trio after picking a gun from Harrison's pocket. The three try to escape in a truck, only to discover that it is loaded with explosives and that Harrison intends to blow up an airplane factory. Chuck and Edith escape with evidence exposing the spy ring, while Eddie sacrifices his own life destroying the truck. The military posthumously awards Eddie a medal for heroism.

Cast          
Bruce Bennett as Lieutenant John Cronin
Kay Harris as Edith Cassell
Edward Norris as Eddie Miller
Sidney Blackmer as Carlyle Harrison
Don Beddoe as Chief Hanley
John Tyrrell as Robert Fuller
George McKay as Chuck Brown
Robert Emmett Keane as Conrad
Eddie Laughton as Felix
Lester Dorr as Harry

References

External links
 

1942 films
American action films
1940s action films
Columbia Pictures films
Films directed by Lew Landers
American black-and-white films
1940s English-language films
1940s American films